Kāpi is a popular rāga in Carnatic music, the classical music of South India. Kāpi is a janya rāgam of Kharaharapriya with a meandering vakra scale. Typically performed at slow and medium speeds, it is capable of inducing moods of devotion, pathos and sadness in the listeners. Kāpi is different from the Hindustani raag and thaat Kafi. The equivalent raag in Hindustani is Pilu.

Structure and Lakshana

Kāpi is an audava-vakra sampoorna rāgam with an ascending pentatonic scale and a descending scale with seven notes, but not in a descending order. Use of Kakali Nishadam and Anthara Gandharam make it a Bhashanga Raagam.

 : 
 :  

The presence of different nishāda swarās (N2 and N3) lends a distinctive quality to Kāpi, along with the fact that it uses a set of vakra swarās (N2 D2 N2).

There is also a mild presence of shuddha daivatham (D1) that renders an invaluable feeling of devotion to the raagam. This, and the presence of Anthara Gandharam (G3) makes it difficult to pinpoint the exact nature of the avarohana of the raagam.

In the song Jagadhodharana composed by Sangeeta Pitamaha Sri Purandara Dasa, the note Suddha Dhaivatham (Dha1) also occurs as a foreign note(anya swara)

Kapi ragam gives the feeling Devotion, Sentiment and happiness

Compositions

Some of the popular compositions in Kāpi are:

 Jagadoddhārana Adisidaleshode, Bannisi gopi - Purandaradasa
 Mee Valla Gunadosha Memi, Intha Sowkhya - Thyagaraja
 Venkatachalapate Ninu Nammiti - Muthuswami Dikshitar **
 Viharamanasa Rame, Smarasi Pura, Sree Madhavamanu - Swathi Thirunal
 Enna thavam seydanai Yashoda - Papanasam Sivan
 Bhaja maadhavam anisham - Mysore Vasudevacharya
 Maya Gopabala - K C Kesava Pillai
 Jaanaki ramana dasaratha nandana - Vanamaamalai Jeeyar Swami
 Javo Mat Thum (Upaakhyanam) - Swathi Thirunal
 Chinnanchiru Kiliye (First two stanzas) - Subramanya Bharathi
 Kurai Ondrum Illai (Two charanam verses) - Chakravarti Rajagopalachari
 Karthikeyanai - Mayuram Viswanatha Sastri
 Aravinda Padamalar - Ambujam Krishna
 Charanamule Nammiti - Bhadrachala Ramadasu
 Kanaka Simham - Kalyani Varadarajan
Kanna Vaa Manivanna Vaa (First two verses) - Ambujam Krishna
 Nee mattume en nenjil nirkirai - Perumal Murugan and K Arun Prakash

** Kāpi of Muthuswami Dikshitar is quite different from the traditional Kāpi and often cited as karNATaka Kāpi

The Moorchana of Kāpi as per Venkatamakhin is S R2 G2 M1 P D2 N2 S/ N2 D2 P M1 G2 G2 R2 S

Film Songs

Language:Tamil

Notes

References

Janya ragas